Julius Petrus Bilmeyer (Berchem, 4 November 1850 – Berchem, 13 June 1920) was a Flemish architect and professor at the Antwerp Academy.

Bilmeyer enrolled in the architecture courses at the Antwerp Academy from 1865 to 1870. He worked simultaneously at the architecture office of the Baeckelmans brothers: Frans Clemens Baeckelmans (1827–1896) and Jan Lodewijk Baeckelmans (1835–1871).

Built work
List of built churches and cloisters in Belgium:

 monastery and basilica of the Holy Hart in Antwerp
 church Virgin of Mercy in Antwerp
 church Saint Anthony in Antwerp
 church Carlo Saint-Job in Ukkel
 church Saint-Katarina in Antwerp
 church Saint Anthony of Padua in Essen
 church St. Luciakerk in Oosterlo
 church Assumption of Mary in Wuustwezel
 church St. Nicholas in Morkhoven
 restoration of the church in Eppegem
 monastery en chapel of Franciscan Sisters in Antwerp

Housing projects built by Bilmeyer and Van Riel:

 Carolus-Magnus dwellings in Berchem

External links
Inventory Hystorical Buildings

External links
 

Belgian architects
1850 births
1920 deaths
People from Berchem